The Switzerland  women's national under-19 volleyball team represents Switzerland in international women's volleyball competitions and friendly matches under the age 19 and it is ruled and managed by the Swiss Volleyball Federation That is an affiliate of Federation of International Volleyball FIVB and also a part of European Volleyball Confederation CEV.

History

Results

Summer Youth Olympics
 Champions   Runners up   Third place   Fourth place

FIVB U19 World Championship
 Champions   Runners up   Third place   Fourth place

Europe Girls' Youth Championship
 Champions   Runners up   Third place   Fourth place

Team

Current squad
The Following players is the Swiss players that Competed in the 2018 Girls' U17 Volleyball European Championship Qualifiacations

References

External links
www.volleyball.ch/

National women's under-18 volleyball teams
V
Volleyball in Switzerland